Phaeothyriolum is a genus of fungi in the Microthyriaceae family.

Species
As accepted by Species Fungorum;
 Phaeothyriolum amygdalinum 
 Phaeothyriolum corymbiae 
 Phaeothyriolum dunnii 
 Phaeothyriolum eucalyptinum 
 Phaeothyriolum eucalyptorum 
 Phaeothyriolum microthyrioides 
 Phaeothyriolum smilacis

References

External links
Index Fungorum

Microthyriales